Diplococcium is a genus of fungi belonging to the family Vibrisseaceae.

The genus has almost cosmopolitan distribution.

Species

Species:

Diplococcium aquaticum 
Diplococcium asperum 
Diplococcium atrovelutinum

References

Helotiales
Helotiales genera